Giuseppe Rizzo (born 18 March 1991) is an Italian footballer who plays as a midfielder for  club Catania.

Club career
He started his career in Serie B with Reggina, debuted for the club on 26 November 2009, in the Coppa Italia defeat against Palermo. His debut in Serie B was on 19 April 2010, against Crotone. The final result of the match was a win for Reggina. Rizzo made his first goal for the club on the match against Piacenza.

On 10 August 2020 he moved to Triestina on a 2-year contract.

On 31 August 2021 he returned to Pescara. On 29 January 2022, he joined his home town club ACR Messina on loan until the end of the season.

International career
Rizzo was called for the first time by manager Ciro Ferrara for the Italy U-21 squad in a friendly match against Turkey, in November 2010. On 17 November 2010, the match was played at Stadio Bruno Recchioni in Fermo. The final result was 2-1 and Rizzo came off the bench for his debut on the 75 minute.

In 2011–12 season he played once for Italy under-21 Serie B representative team, the B team of U21.

References

External links
 FIGC 
Profile at Reggina Calcio official website 

Le rubriche di retestadio.it - Campioni in erba

1991 births
Living people
Sportspeople from Messina
Footballers from Sicily
Italian footballers
Association football midfielders
Serie A players
Serie B players
Serie C players
Serie D players
Reggina 1914 players
Delfino Pescara 1936 players
A.C. Perugia Calcio players
L.R. Vicenza players
U.S. Salernitana 1919 players
Catania S.S.D. players
U.S. Triestina Calcio 1918 players
A.C.R. Messina players
Italy under-21 international footballers